Zina Lisandrou Panagidi (born 1955), is a Cypriot pedagogue and politician, current mayoress of Lefkoniko, city that is de facto under Northern Cyprus but De Jure under Republic of Cyprus since she was elected in December 2016 local elections, being one of the four female elected mayoress in the country. She graduated from the Philosophical School of the National and Kapodistrian University of Athens on 1977 and in 1993 a master's degree in Educational Policy and Management for University of Albany. She also worked in radio and TV

References

1955 births
Living people
21st-century Cypriot women politicians
21st-century Cypriot politicians
Women educators
National and Kapodistrian University of Athens alumni
University at Albany, SUNY alumni
Women mayors of places in Cyprus